William Tredwell "Treddy" Ketcham, Jr. (August 6, 1919 – July 18, 2006) was a United States Marine Corps officer in World War II and a sports director in tennis and squash afterwards.

Life

At the beginning of 1945, he commanded the 1st Company 3rd Battalion of the 24th Regiment of the United States Marine Corps in the Pacific War. During the Battle of Iwo Jima he was wounded by a bullet in his arm and shrapnel in his leg. Despite his wounds and loss of blood he refused to be evacuated. With the risk of losing his own life, he led his troops off the strand and launched a successful counterattack against some twenty Japanese soldiers that had been firing upon them.

After the war he graduated from Yale Law School, and worked for the American Secretary of State in London, as a special assistant to the chairman of NATO. Upon returning to New York City he served for the law firm Davis Polk & Wardwell. He was subsequently hired as a special counsel for IBM until his pension in 1984.

Outside his career, Ketcham was a passionate tennis and squash player. For these sports he worked on the highest administrative ranks. As such he was president of the United States Squash Racquets Association, and for many years director of the International Lawn Tennis Club (USIC).

He donated money to fund the Yale Squash Center which was named for him. The Treddy Ketcham Yale Club Invitational tournament is held there each year.

Ketcham also served as a long-standing president of the Rockaway Hunting Club, which included golf, tennis and squash as major activities. Next to that he participated in many other boards, like the Saint Nicholas Society in the City of New York (President), the Riot Relief Fund and the Society of Colonial Wars of the state of New York (Governor). Ketcham was from an old New York family.  He was a direct descendant of Cornelius Vanderbilt.

He died on July 18, 2006, in Lawrence (Long Island).

Recognition
For his heroic action at Iwo Jima Beach at the beginning of  1945 he was distinguished with the Navy Cross. Furthermore, he was mentioned as an exemplary marine at the presentation of the Freedom medal as well as in the category of Freedom from fear of the Four Freedoms Awards.

Navy Cross citation

References
Home of Heroes, Full Text Citations For Award of The Navy Cross To U.S. Marines - World War II
New York Times (July 19, 2006) Paid Notice: Deaths - Ketcham, William Tredwell Jr.

http://www.jamestownpress.com/news/2006-03-23/Obituaries/025.html

United States Marine Corps personnel of World War II
United States Marine Corps officers
Squash in the United States
American tennis people
Recipients of the Navy Cross (United States)
People from Cedarhurst, New York
1919 births
2006 deaths
Davis Polk & Wardwell lawyers